Charley's Aunt (Italian: La zia di Carlo) is a 1943 Italian comedy film directed by Alfredo Guarini and starring Erminio Macario, Carlo Minello and Maurizio D'Ancora.

It is based on the 1892 play Charley's Aunt by Brandon Thomas. The film was shot at Fert Studios in Turin.

Cast
 Erminio Macario as Terenzio  
 Carlo Minello as Carlo  
 Maurizio D'Ancora as Guidobaldo  
 Lucy D'Albert as Lucia Tuberosa  
 Silvana Jachino as Rina  
 Lori Randi as Dora  
 Virgilio Riento as Casimiro, it tutore  
 Guglielmo Barnabò as Il colonnello  
 Carlo Rizzo as Il maggiordomo  
 Lia Corelli as La figlia del giardiniere  
 Linda Pini as L'autentica zia  
 Giulio Alfieri 
 Irina Ingris 
 Carlo Moreno

References

Bibliography 
 Roberto Chiti & Enrico Lancia. Dizionario del cinema italiano: I film. Gremese Editore, 2005.

External links 
 

1943 films
Italian comedy films
1943 comedy films
1940s Italian-language films
Films directed by Alfredo Guarini
Films based on Charley's Aunt
Italian black-and-white films
1940s Italian films